81st meridian may refer to:

81st meridian east, a line of longitude east of the Greenwich Meridian
81st meridian west, a line of longitude west of the Greenwich Meridian